Ubiquitarion iridis, the iridescent semi-slug is a tree-dwelling snail in the family Helicarionidae. 

It is endemic to Australia. This species occurs in and near rainforests in north eastern New South Wales and south eastern Queensland. Accidentally introduced to Sydney and the Central Coast of New South Wales.

References

 Hyman, I. T. (2007). Three new genera and five new species of Helicarionidae from southeastern Australia (Pulmonata: Stylommatophora: Helicarionoidea). Molluscan Research. 27(2): 89–104

External links
 Hyman I.T., de la Iglesia Lamborena I. & Köhler F. (2017). Molecular phylogenetics and systematic revision of the south-eastern Australian Helicarionidae (Gastropoda, Stylommatophora). Contributions to Zoology. 86(1): 51-95

Helicarionidae
Endemic fauna of Australia
Gastropods described in 2007